Jan-Carl Raspe (24 July 1944 – 18 October 1977) was a member of the German militant group, the Red Army Faction (RAF).

Early life
Raspe was born in Seefeld in Tirol (then Germany, now Austria). He was described as gentle but had difficulty communicating with other people. His father, a businessman, died before his birth and Raspe and his two older sisters were raised by his mother and two aunts. Although living in East Berlin, he went to West Berlin when the Berlin Wall was built in 1961, and stayed there, living with his uncle and aunt. He co-founded Kommune II in 1967 and joined the Red Army Faction, also known as the "Baader-Meinhof Gang", in 1970.

Militancy

On 1 June 1972, Raspe along with Andreas Baader and Holger Meins had gone to check on a garage in Frankfurt where they had been storing materials used to make incendiary devices. Raspe had gone along as the driver (they were driving a Porsche Targa). However, as soon as they arrived at the garage, police began to swarm around the scene. Meins and Baader had already entered the garage and were surrounded but Raspe, who had remained by the car, fired a shot from his gun and tried to run away when he was rushed by police, but to no avail; he was caught and arrested in a nearby garden. Meins and Baader were arrested soon after.

Raspe was convicted on 28 April 1977 and sentenced to life imprisonment. On 18 October 1977, Raspe was found with a gunshot wound in his cell in Stammheim Prison, Stuttgart. He died shortly after being admitted to a hospital. Fellow RAF members and inmates, Baader and Gudrun Ensslin, were found dead in their cells the same morning. Irmgard Möller was found in her cell, wounded after supposedly stabbing herself in the chest, but survived. The official inquiry concluded that this was a collective suicide, but again conspiracy theories abounded.

See also 
 Members of the RAF

References

External links 
 The Stammheim Deaths

1944 births
1977 suicides
People from Innsbruck-Land District
Members of the Red Army Faction
Sozialistischer Deutscher Studentenbund members
German prisoners sentenced to life imprisonment
Suicides by firearm in Germany
People convicted on terrorism charges
Prisoners who died in German detention
1977 deaths